335P/Gibbs is a periodic comet in the Solar System. It last came to perihelion in August 2022. Together with 266P/Christensen, it was proposed as the source of the 1977 "Wow! Signal".

References

External links 
 Orbital simulation from JPL (Java) / Horizons Ephemeris
 335P on Seiichi Yoshida's comet list
 Elements and Ephemeris for 335P/Gibbs – Minor Planet Center

Periodic comets
0335
335P
20081231